Aplysiopsis minor is a species of sacoglossan sea slug, a shell-less marine opisthobranch gastropod mollusk in the family Hermaeidae.

Distribution
This species is known to occur in Japan.

References

Hermaeidae
Gastropods described in 1959